The William Morris Society was founded in 1955 in London, England. The Society's office and museum are located at Kelmscott House, Hammersmith, where Morris lived from 1879 until his death in 1896.

The Society aims to make more well-known the life and work of the Victorian designer, artist, writer, and socialist William Morris (1834–1896) and his associates. The Society's activities include conferences, educational activities, lectures, museum visits, social events, and tours. The Society also publishes books and pamphlets dealing with the life and work of Morris, a quarterly members' newsletter and, twice a year, the Journal of William Morris Studies (founded in 1961 as the Journal of the William Morris Society).

The Society is a registered charity under English law.

The associated William Morris Society of Canada was founded in 1981 and is based in Toronto, Ontario.

The affiliated William Morris Society in the United States was founded in New York in 1971 and is now based in Washington DC.

See also 
 William Morris Gallery

References

External links 
 The William Morris Society (UK)
 The William Morris Society in the United States
 The William Morris Society of Canada
 The William Morris Society (US) on Facebook

1955 establishments in the United Kingdom
Arts and Crafts movement
Arts organisations based in the United Kingdom
Arts organizations established in 1955
Hammersmith
Historical societies of the United Kingdom
Learned societies of the United Kingdom
William Morris
Museums in the London Borough of Hammersmith and Fulham
Organisations based in the London Borough of Hammersmith and Fulham
Charities based in England